NA-199 Ghotki-II is a constituency for the National Assembly of Pakistan.

Election 2002 

General elections were held on 10 Oct 2002.Ali Mohammad Mahar of PPP won by 77,950 votes.

Election 2008 

General elections were held on 18 Feb 2008. Ali Mohammad Mahar of PPP won by 74,714 votes.

Election 2013 

General elections were held on 11 May 2013. Ali Mohammad Mahar of PPP won by 124,472 votes and became the  member of National Assembly.

Election 2018 

General elections are scheduled to be held on 25 July 2018.

By-election 2019 
The seat had fallen vacant following the death of former federal minister and father of Ahmad Ali, Ali Mohammad Khan Mahar

See also
NA-198 Ghotki-I
NA-200 Sukkur-I

References

External links 
Election result's official website

NA-201